Valentin Dmitriyevich Zakharov was a Soviet former figure skater. He was a two-time Soviet national champion. In 1956, Zakharov was included in the Soviet Union's first-ever team to the European Championships. He placed 16th at the 1956 Europeans in Paris, 11th at the 1957 Europeans in Vienna, and 11th at the 1958 Europeans in Bratislava. In 1958, he competed at the World Championships in Paris – the Soviet Union's debut at the event. He finished 20th.

Competitive highlights

References 

1930s births
Soviet male single skaters
Living people